Merl, or MERL, may refer to:

 Merl (name)
 Merl, Luxembourg, a quarter of Luxembourg City
 Merl (Buffyverse), a fictional character in the television series Angel

Abbreviation 
 Mechanical Engineering Research Laboratory
 Mitsubishi Electric Research Laboratories
 Museum of English Rural Life

See also 
 Common blackbird, merl in Scottish English
 Merle (disambiguation)
 Merlin (disambiguation)